The UAE Ice Sports Federation (UAEISF) administers ice hockey activities in United Arab Emirates. It recruits and trains nationals for sporting programs.

References

External links
UAE ICE Sports Federation

United Arab Emirates
United Arab Emirates
Ice